Elections to Midlothian Council were held on 6 May 1999, the same day as the other Scottish local government elections and the Scottish Parliament general election.

Labour retained their dominance of the council, with the Liberal Democrats forming the second largest party on the council.

Election results

Ward results

References

1999 Scottish local elections
1999